The Diemel is a river in Hesse and North Rhine-Westphalia, Germany. It is a left tributary of the Weser.

Route
The source of the Diemel is near Willingen, in Sauerland. The Diemel flows generally northeast through the towns Marsberg, Warburg, and Trendelburg. It flows into the Weser in Bad Karlshafen.

References

Rivers of Hesse
Rivers of North Rhine-Westphalia
Sauerland
 
Rivers of Germany